

Karl Kessel (1 June 1912 – 24 August 1997) was a German officer during World War II and a general in the armed forces of West Germany. He was a recipient of the Knight's Cross of the Iron Cross of Nazi Germany. Kessel joined the Bundeswehr in 1956 and retired in 1970 as a Generalmajor.

Awards

 Knight's Cross of the Iron Cross on 23 January 1944 as Oberstleutnant and Geschwaderkommodore of Kampfgeschwader 2

References

Citations

Bibliography

 

1912 births
1997 deaths
Luftwaffe pilots
Bundeswehr generals
People from the Rhine Province
Major generals of the German Air Force
Recipients of the Gold German Cross
Recipients of the Knight's Cross of the Iron Cross
Commanders Crosses of the Order of Merit of the Federal Republic of Germany
German World War II pilots
Military personnel from Mülheim